This is a list of U.S. states and territories by historical population, as enumerated every decade by the United States Census. As required by the United States Constitution, a census has been conducted every 10 years since 1790. Although the decennial census collects a variety of information that has been used in demographic studies, marketing, and other enterprises, the purpose of the census as stated in the Constitution is to produce an "actual enumeration" of the number of persons in the states in order to calculate their Congressional apportionment.

As the United States has grown in area and population, new states have been formed out of U.S. territories or the division of existing states. The population figures provided here reflect modern state boundaries. Shaded areas of the tables indicate census years when a territory or the part of another state had not yet been admitted as a new state. Since 1920, the "total population" of the United States has been considered the population of all the States and the District of Columbia; territories and other possessions were counted as additional population. , five U.S. territories (American Samoa, Guam, the Northern Mariana Islands, Puerto Rico and the U.S. Virgin Islands), along with the U.S. Minor Outlying Islands, are not included in the count of total U.S. population.

1790–1860, census data

Total population, 1790–1860
Total population counts for the Censuses of 1790 through 1860 include both free and enslaved persons. Native Americans were not identified in the Census of 1790 through 1840 and only sporadically from 1850 until 1890, if they lived outside of Indian Territory or off reservations. Beginning with the 1900 census, Native Americans were fully enumerated along with the general population.

Enslaved population, 1790–1860
The below figures cover only people held in bondage. They are also counted in the total population figures above.

1870–1950, census data

1960–2020, census data

Minor Outlying Islands population, 1910–2000, census data
Several small island territories are included in the U.S. Census Bureau's Island Areas region as U.S. Minor Outlying Islands. These mostly lack permanent residents, but have been included in some census counts since 1910. Prior to 1959, most of the Pacific minor island territories were enumerated with the Hawaii Territory, but not included in the territory's population count. Minor Outlying Islands that have never had a population enumerated by the U.S. Census Bureau are not included. Since 2000, the U.S. Census Bureau has not reported data for the Minor Outlying Islands as part of its standard data products.

U.S. federally affiliated overseas population, 1900–2020, census data
Since 1900, the U.S. Census Bureau has worked to count Americans living overseas, including those soldiers and sailors overseas, merchants on vessels at sea, and diplomats. (Counts were also provided in the 1830 and 1840 Censuses.) Attempts to count private citizens have been made, too, but with only minimal success. In 1970 and since 1990, the "U.S. Federally Affiliated Overseas Population" — essentially citizens serving in military, diplomatic, and other federal agency postings overseas — have been counted based upon federal records. For the purpose of apportionment, they are assigned to their on-record home state. Figures prior to 2000 are from Americans Overseas in U.S. Censuses. Data for 2000 and 2010 is from a 2012 Census assessment report, and 2020 data is from that year's Census.

Former territories, 1920–1990, census data
Several territories and possessions held by the United States during the 1800s and 1900s gained independence or were transferred to other nations. The populations of these former territories as reported in the census are listed below.

1900–2022, Federal Reserve economic data

Source: http://research.stlouisfed.org/fred2/release?rid=118

See also
United States Census
United States congressional apportionment
List of U.S. states and territories by population
List of U.S. states by population density
List of U.S. states by population growth rate
List of colonial and pre-Federal U.S. historical population
Largest cities in the United States by population by decade
List of largest cities of U.S. states and territories by historical population

References
General
 State data, 1790–1990: 
 National data, 1790–1990: 
 State and national data, 2000–2010:

Notes

United States States By Historical Population
Population, Historical
United States demography-related lists